Jakoman and Tetsu is a screenplay by Akira Kurosawa and Senkichi Taniguchi that was based on the novel Nishin gyogyo (Herring Fishery) by Keizo Kajino. It has been adapted into film twice.

1949 Toho adaptation
Jakoman and Tetsu (1949) is a Toho Studios adaptation directed by co-screenwriter Senkichi Taniguchi starring Toshiro Mifune. This adaptation was followed by a sequel, Tetsu of Jilba (ジルバの鉄) (1950), co-written by Akira Kurosawa and Goro Tanada and directed by Isamu Kosugi, with Utaemon Ichikawa taking over the role of Tetsu.

1964 Toei adaptation
Jakoman and Tetsu (1964) is a Toei Studios adaptation based on the earlier screenplay directed by Kinji Fukasaku and starring Ken Takakura and Tetsuro Tamba.

References

Films with screenplays by Akira Kurosawa